Clarkton may refer to:
 Clarkton, North Carolina
 Clarkton, Missouri